Kelly and Cal is a 2014 American comedy-drama film directed by Jen McGowan, and starring Juliette Lewis, Jonny Weston, and Cybill Shepherd. Its plot follows an ex-punk rocker-turned-suburban-housewife who becomes friends with a troubled 17-year-old boy.

Cast
Juliette Lewis as Kelly 
Jonny Weston as Cal
Josh Hopkins as Josh
Cybill Shepherd as Bev
Lucy Owen as Julie
Ken Marks as Bill
Margaret Colin as Janice

Critical response
The film has a 74% approval rating on Rotten Tomatoes based on 30 reviews. Rodrigo Perez of IndieWire wrote that "while Kelly & Cal flirts with interesting concepts under a superficial dynamic you haven’t seen paired before, ultimately its narrative is both familiar and predictable."

References

External links
 

2014 films
2014 comedy films
2014 drama films
2014 comedy-drama films
2010s buddy comedy-drama films
2010s teen comedy-drama films
2010s English-language films
American buddy comedy-drama films
American teen comedy-drama films
Films about paraplegics or quadriplegics
Films scored by Toby Chu
IFC Films films
2010s American films